Kenneth Wayne Smith (born July 12, 1953) is an American former professional basketball player. He played in the American Basketball Association for the San Antonio Spurs at the beginning of the 1975–76 season.

References

1953 births
Living people
American men's basketball players
Basketball players from Dallas
Houston Rockets draft picks
Lon Morris Bearcats basketball players
San Antonio Spurs draft picks
San Antonio Spurs players
Small forwards
Tulsa Golden Hurricane men's basketball players